George Richardson VC (1 August 1831 – 28 January 1923) was born in Derrylane, Killeshandra, County Cavan the son of John and Anne Richardson. He became an Irish recipient of the Victoria Cross, the highest and most prestigious award for gallantry in the face of the enemy that can be awarded to British and Commonwealth forces.

Details
He was 27 years old, and a private in the 34th Regiment of Foot (later The Border Regiment), British Army during the Indian Mutiny when the following deed took place for which he was awarded the VC:
At Kewanie, Trans-Gogra, on the 27th of April. 1859, for determined courage in having, although severely wounded,—one arm being disabled,—closed with and secured a Rebel Sepoy armed with a loaded revolver.

He emigrated to Montreal, Canada and joined / Served with the 1st Prince of Wales Regiment (1st P.W.R.), an antecedent unit of The Canadian Grenadier Guards and achieved the rank of sergeant from approx. 1865–1878. He retired, and was given a land grant in Southern, Ontario where he lived until passing in London, Ontario, Canada on 28 January 1923.

References

The Register of the Victoria Cross (1981, 1988 and 1997)

Ireland's VCs  (Dept of Economic Development, 1995)
Monuments to Courage (David Harvey, 1999)
Irish Winners of the Victoria Cross (Richard Doherty & David Truesdale, 2000)
 Irregular correspondence
Breifne Journal 2015 (Journal of Cumann Seanchais Bhreifne); Victoria Cross recipients from County Cavan

External links

 

Irish recipients of the Victoria Cross
Border Regiment soldiers
People from County Cavan
1831 births
1923 deaths
19th-century Irish people
Irish soldiers in the British Army
Indian Rebellion of 1857 recipients of the Victoria Cross
Irish emigrants to Canada (before 1923)
People of the Fenian raids
Deaths from pneumonia in Ontario
British Army recipients of the Victoria Cross
Military personnel from County Cavan